The 1996 All-Ireland Senior Camogie Championship—known as the Bórd na Gaeilge All-Ireland Senior Camogie Championship for sponsorship reasons—was the high point of the 1996 season. The championship was won for the first time in the county’s history by Galway who defeated Killkenny by a two-point margin in the final. The match drew an attendance of 10,235, then the highest in the history of camogie.

Semi-finals
Martina Harkin retrieved a ball near the end line and set up the 15-year-old Veronica Curtin for a goal for Galway against Wexford after just two minutes of the All Ireland semi-final for what proved to be the decisive goal of the match. Cork defeated Kilkenny by four points in a disappointing second semi-final at Páirc Uí Rinn. The Connacht Tribune reported:
They built up a nine point lead in the first half and showed a resolve after the break that never let Wexford back into the game. The Wexford goal proved little more than a consolation score, coming in the last few minutes when all was already lost.
Cork had to fight all the way to Beat Kilkenny by four points at Páirc Uí Rinn, having led 0-7 to 0-4 at half-time Sinéad Millea had picked off some fine points to raise Kilkenny hopes before Lynn Dunlea struck for the decisive goal for Cork.

Final
Two goals either side of half time from Denise Gilligan decided the outcome of the final. When midfielder Sharon Glynn pointing from a free in the first minute in the final, the score was not recorded. Galway manager Tony Ward had clarified with referee Aine Derham that the point stood. The players were unaware that the score was actually closer than displayed.

Shortly after scoring, Glynn took a blow to the head which affected her for long periods, particularly in the opening half, with her accuracy deserting her. Her long pucks from midfield frequently went wide, and Galway had five wides in the opening 30 minutes.

Cork, edged ahead 0-5 to 0-4 by the 20th minute, with all their scores coming from frees as Lynn Dunlea and Fiona O'Driscoll displayed their accuracy have thought that the game was theirs for the taking when Lynn Dunlea displayed remarkable persistence in shaking off the attentions of Olive Costello to put her side ahead 1-7 to 0-4."

Cork led by three points at half time, it would have been six had not Denise Gilligan scored the first of her two goals. Denise Gilligan received from Sharon Glynn for the first of two goals in three minutes at the start for the second half. Two minutes later Gilligan was also involved in the move that saw the winners edge in front when she found Harkin. Kathleen Costine saved again but Marian Harkin retained her composure to score Galway’s third goal. Galway now led by 3-6 to 1-9.

They set about consolidating their position, and Sharon Glynn pointed from a 30. A further goal from Dympna Maher, who was another to display remarkable coolness under pressure, made the Cork task that much more difficult, although they still had 18 minutes to retrieve their title. Cork brought it back to a two-point margin, they spurned some easy point chances in search of a goal. Galway won their first All-Ireland in their tenth final appearance 63 years after their first.

Lynn Dunlea gave the winners moments of anxiety right at the end when she pointed twice one from a placed ball to leave the victory margin only two points.

Galway captain Imelda Hobbins said:
"I knew that if we were below six points behind them at the break that we would win the All Ireland. Those goals just after the break were an almighty boost for us.

Denise Gilligan said: 
"I can't believe it. I thought the final whistle would never go. When Cork were ahead we knew we had it all to play for. But in the second half we got in front of the backs and that was the difference. We were also playing the ball in low to the forwards."

Denise later went to live in London and played for Tara in the All Ireland Junior club final of 2011, 15 years after her two goal All Ireland winning performance.

Final stages

References

External links
 All-Ireland Senior Camogie Championship: Roll of Honour

1996 in camogie
1996